The City of Warrnambool is a local government area in the Barwon South West region of Victoria, Australia, located in the south-western part of the state. It is entirely surrounded by the Shire of Moyne and the Southern Ocean. It is one of only a few regional councils in Victoria to remain serving just one urban district after the amalgamation process of 1994, although through that process it did gained some portions of the former Shire of Warrnambool.

The City is governed and administered by the Warrnambool City Council; its seat of local government and administrative centre is located at the council headquarters in the central district of Warrnambool. The City is named after the main urban settlement located in the centre of the LGA, that is Warrnambool, which is also the LGA's most populous urban centre with a population of 28,413.

History
Warrnambool was first incorporated as a municipality on 7 December 1855. It became a borough on 1 October 1863, and a town on 2 February 1883. It was proclaimed as a city on 8 April 1918.

In 1993, the new Kennett Liberal government announced a program of local government reform, in which many of Victoria's 210 councils were to be amalgamated. The southwest region containing 23 councils was the first to be reviewed, and the City of Warrnambool sought to be part of the process early on. Warrnambool's strength in tertiary education and manufacturing was taken into account. By June, it was clear that Warrnambool would be the only municipality in the region to be spared, and that it would gain Allansford and some other rural areas from the Shire of Warrnambool. On 23 September 1994, the council was dismissed and replaced with a Government-appointed commissioner. It first held elections for a new council in March 1996.

Council

Current composition
The council is composed of seven councillors elected to represent an unsubdivided municipality.

The most recent council election was declared on 10 November 2020, with the Councillors sworn into office on 23 November 2020. At their first meeting, Councillors resolved to elect both a Mayor and Deputy Mayor, each for a term of 12 months.

Former wards
Prior to the statewide amalgamations of the 1990s, the council had four wards and twelve councillors, with three councillors per ward elected to represent each ward; the former wards were Albert, Hopkins, Merri and Victoria. The new council then had, until 2004, seven wards and seven councillors, with one councillor per ward elected to represent each ward. However post-2004, following an electoral representation review, the decision was made to keep the seven councillors, but abolish the wards, as the review concluded that the geography and natural features of Warrnambool didn't support the retention of equal wards, and that the City of Warrnambool as a whole was a single community of interest.

Former wards from 1996 to 2004:
 Botanic Ward
 Cassady Ward
 Levy Ward
 Pertobe Ward
 Proudfoot Ward
 Sherwood Ward
 Wollaston Ward

Administration and governance
The council meets in the council chambers at the council headquarters in the Warrnambool Civic Centre, which is also the location of the council's administrative activities. It also provides customer services at its administrative centre in Warrnambool.

Geography
The City of Warrnambool is dominated by the Warrnambool urban area, which represents , or 29.0%, of the City's area and at the 2006 census had a population of 28,150.

Townships and localities
The 2021 census, the city had a population of 35,406 up from 33,655 in the 2016 census

^ - Territory divided with another LGA

See also
 Warrnambool
 List of localities (Victoria)

References

External links
Warrnambool City Council official website
Metlink local public transport map
Link to Land Victoria interactive maps
Warrnambool & District Historical Society

Local government areas of Victoria (Australia)
Barwon South West (region)
 
Warrnambool